List of University of Edinburgh medical people is a list of notable graduates as well as non-graduates, and academic staffs of the University of Edinburgh Medical School in Scotland.

Pioneers in medicine

Founders of medical schools and universities

Leaders in medicine

Pioneers in science and humanities

Non-medical accomplishments

Faculty (who were not also graduates of the medical school)

See also
List of Nobel laureates affiliated with the University of Edinburgh

References 

Medical
Medical
Edinburgh-related lists
Edinburgh, Medical
Edinburgh